The Canton of Tournon-Saint-Martin is a former canton situated in the Indre département and in the Centre region of France. It was disbanded following the French canton reorganisation which came into effect in March 2015. It consisted of 10 communes, which joined the canton of Le Blanc in 2015. It had 4,550 inhabitants (2012).

The canton comprised the following communes:

Fontgombault
Lingé
Lurais
Lureuil
Martizay
Mérigny
Néons-sur-Creuse
Preuilly-la-Ville
Sauzelles
Tournon-Saint-Martin

Demography

See also
 Arrondissements of the Indre department
 Cantons of the Indre department
 Communes of the Indre department

References

Former cantons of Indre
2015 disestablishments in France
States and territories disestablished in 2015